Karl Immanuel Eberhard Ritter von Goebel FRS FRSE (8 March 1855, Billigheim, Baden – 9 October 1932, Munich) was a German botanist. His main fields of study were comparative functional anatomy, morphology, and the developmental physiology of plants under the influence of both phylogenetic and extrinsic factors.

Life
Starting in 1873, Goebel studied theology and philosophy, as well as botany with Wilhelm Hofmeister, at the University of Tuebingen. In 1876 he moved to Strasbourg, where he worked with Anton de Bary, and from which he graduated in 1877 with his Ph.D. In 1878, Goebel became assistant to Julius von Sachs, and in 1880 a lecturer at the University of Würzburg. In 1881 he became first assistant to August Schenk of the University of Leipzig, then an associate professor at Strasbourg, and 1882 associate professor at the University of Rostock, where in 1884 he founded the botanical garden and a botanical institute. From 1887–1891 he was a professor at Marburg, and from 1891–1931 at the University of Munich, where he laid out the new Botanischer Garten München-Nymphenburg, and served as its first director. In 1885–1886 he undertook research trips to Ceylon and Java, in 1890–1891 Venezuela and then British Guiana.

Goebel was editor of "Flora" from 1889 onwards.  In 1892 he became a full member of the Bavarian Academy of Sciences (later serving as President). In 1910 he was elected an Honorary Fellow of the Royal Society of Edinburgh. 

In 1911, botanist Franz Stephani published Goebeliellaceae, which is a family of liverworts belonging to the order Porellales. The family consists of only one genus: Goebeliella Steph., which was named in Goebel's honour.

In 1914 was named a foreign member of the Accademia Nazionale dei Lincei in Rome, and in 1926 was elected to the Royal Society. In 1931, he was awarded the Linnean Medal of the Linnean Society of London.

References

External links 

1855 births
1932 deaths
19th-century German botanists
Academic staff of the University of Greifswald
Honorary Fellows of the Royal Society of Edinburgh
Foreign Members of the Royal Society
Foreign associates of the National Academy of Sciences
Corresponding Members of the Russian Academy of Sciences (1917–1925)
Corresponding Members of the USSR Academy of Sciences
University of Strasbourg alumni
20th-century German botanists
People from Neckar-Odenwald-Kreis
Members of the Royal Society of Sciences in Uppsala